Verka (Macedonian: Верка) is a music band from Delčevo, Republic of Macedonia. They play authentic metal combined with elements of traditional Macedonian music that includes folk instruments such as folk drum, kettle drum, bagpipes, clarinet and bendir. The members of the band are Vlatko Nushev – Dalton (drums), Mars Marsovski (guitar), Mazdrak (bass guitar, vocals) and Hiko (folk drum, kettle drum).

Beginnings
Verka was formed in 1999 by Mazdrak (synthesizer, vocals), Mars Marsovski (bass guitar) and Vlatko Nushev – Dalton (drums) who were at that time members of the bands Modified Gods (Mars and Dalton) and New Age Messiah (Mazdrak). During that period, the band played several gigs throughout Macedonia (in Skopje, Štip, Kratovo, Delčevo, Probištip, Ohrid). After one of these shows, Mazdrak's synthesizer was stolen together with its entire programming. Because he had no finances to buy a new synthesizer, he started playing the bass guitar, Mars moved to playing the guitar, a new member, Brane Antovski – Blackie, joined them and started playing folk instruments (folk drum, kettle drum, bagpipes, clarinet, bendir) and thus the band changed their sound.

Activity
In 2001, Verka won the first prize from both the jury and the audience at Rock Fest music festival in Skopje. As winners, they recorded several tracks at the M2 Studio of the Macedonian Radio Television. These tracks were later released as their demo EP. That same year, as winners of the Demo Taksirat Festival, they got the privilege to play at the festival of that time – Taksirat 1+2 in Skopje.

In 2002, the band released their first album named Dzaga (Macedonian: Џага) through Lithium Records – Skopje and it became one of the most selling albums of that year. After the release of Dzaga, they actively performed at clubs and festivals (Alarm Festival – Macedonia, ExYu Rocks – Bosnia and Herzegovina). One of their most significant shows during that time was playing as a support band for Soulfly in Skopje.

Despite already having their debut album recorded, Verka did not get a real opportunity for promotion because the record company, Lithium Records, did not stick to the agreement. As a result, in 2003 the band took an unintended break that was used for creating new music.

In 2009, Verka promoted the video for their new song called "Ogin" and returned to the music scene. In December 2010, the band released their second album on their own - the album was entitled Motorni Pesni (Macedonian: Моторни песни) after the poetry book by the Macedonian poet Nikola Vaptsarov.

During 2011, the band promoted the new album with several concerts around the country (in Skopje, Delčevo, Kumanovo, Bitola).

In June 2012, Verka went on a Balkan tour and promoted its latest material by performing in Subotica, Novi Sad, Belgrade, Zagreb, Ljubljana, Kranj, Beltinci, Sarajevo and Podgorica.

Since August 2012, Brane Antovski is no longer a member of the band. He was replaced by Hristijan Nikolovski - Hiko. In 2013–2014 the band went through some lineup changes: Mazdrak quit the band, and was replaced by Sime Zlatkov as vocalist and Zlatko Andonovski as bass player. The new lineup recorded the next Verka album named Werk.A, and released it in 2015 via Miner Recordings.

Band members
Vlatko Nushev – drums
Mars Marsovski – guitar
Hristijan Nikolovski-Hiko - folk drum, kettle drum
Zlatko Andonovski-Goldie - Bass
Sime Zlatkov - vocals

Discography

Demo (2001)
Verka's Demo is an EP that consists of 5 tracks recorded at M2 Studio of the Macedonian Radio Television. The tracks were released in collaboration with the record company Lithium Records and handed out for free. Shortly after, the EP was reissued by the popular fanzine Cor, Cordis and distributed together with the magazine.

Track listing:
 Jaggah
 Never Going Out Love
 M.H.O. Parade
 Veronica Dies
 Flowers For Rose

Dzaga (2002)
Dzaga is the debut album by Verka released in September 2002 through Lithium Records. That year, the album became one of the most selling albums in Macedonia. Being their first album, Dzaga gave the band an opportunity to promote their music, even though the poor sound quality of the album did not present the real potential of Verka's music. The album consists of 10 tracks which are written in Macedonian and English.

Track listing:
 M.H.O. Parade
 Jaggah
 Teško!
 Industrija
 Porazličen svet
 Makedoncite
 Never Going Out Love
 Veronica Dies
 Testimony
 Flowers For Rose

Motorni pesni (2010)
Motorni Pesni is the name of Verka's second album which the band members released on their own in 2010. The title of the album as well as its cover are taken from the poetry book by the Macedonian poet Nikola Vapcarov. Two tracks titled Pesni and Gjerdanot contain verses from Vapcarov's poems A Farewell and The Very Last, respectively. The album consists of 8 tracks and all of them are written in Macedonian.

Track listing:
 Pank! Pank! Pank!
 New Found Faith
 Crno oro
 Pesni
 Gjerdanot
 Idnina nebidnina
 Ogin
 Takametera

Werk.A (2014)
The third album from the band, recorded and produced by Vlatko Nushev, later reissued by Miner Recordings in May 2015, contains 9 songs, some in English some in Macedonian. The first album since the lineup change. Guest vocalist on Ortoma is Dame Zlatkov, older brother of current vocalist Sime Zlatkov.

Track listing:

 Extreme cold
 Hikoshiba
 1+1
 Ortoma
 Jungla
 Enki
 Nazemjata
 Deadlove
 iMaster

See also
Music of the Republic of Macedonia

References

External links
 Verka on Myspace
 
 the album Motorni Pesni on soundcloud
 the official video for Ogin
Macedonian Music Network

Macedonian rock music groups
Macedonian heavy metal musical groups
Musical quartets
People from Delčevo